Why I Am Not a Christian is an essay by the British philosopher Bertrand Russell. Originally a talk given 6 March 1927 at Battersea Town Hall, under the auspices of the South London Branch of the National Secular Society, it was published that year as a pamphlet and has been republished several times in English and in translation.

Contents

Russell also questions the morality of religion, which is, in his view, predominantly based on fear.

Russell opens by defining the term 'Christian', rejecting overly broad definitions in favour of two minimal beliefs: that God exists, and that Christ is a supreme moral role-model. He then sets out his reasons for rejecting both of these beliefs, and hence for not labelling himself a Christian.

Russell argues that, although people are usually Christian for emotional reasons or due to their upbringing, it is Catholic dogma that belief in God can be defended by reason alone. Russell then proceeds to attack the main arguments of this kind. The first cause argument is rejected on the grounds that God may not be the first cause or that there may be no first cause at all. The natural law argument is rejected on the grounds that quantum physics produces a probabilistic rather than law-like picture, that the laws are just human descriptions of reality rather than prescriptions (like law in the ordinary sense), and that there is no satisfactory account of God's role as law-giver even if there are such laws. The design argument is rejected on the grounds of evolution and the problem of evil. The moral argument is rejected on the grounds of the Euthyphro dilemma, and a modified version based on the remedying of injustice the non-existence of perfect justice (due to the improbability of an afterlife or similar).

Russell then moves on to Christ, and argues that although some of his teachings are praiseworthy, the balance is such that he is not the supreme moral role-model (in comparison to Socrates or Buddha). Russell expresses doubt in the historicity of Christ, but suggests that even if the account in the Gospels is accepted in its entirety then Christ is still not worthy of worship. Russell highlights Christ's teachings on turning the other cheek and helping the poor as examples of the praiseworthy kind, but suggests that these are ironically those least often followed by Christians. Russell then cites chiefly Christ's frequent invocations of Hell (but also the stories of the Gadarene swine and the fig-tree) as examples of those teachings that suggest imperfection in both kindness and wisdom.

Russell closes by suggesting that religion is the chief obstacle to moral progress, and an appeal to replace it with science (which can dispel the fear that Russell suggests is the chief cause of all religion) and the moral aim to make the world in which we live a better place.

"A good world needs knowledge, kindliness, and courage; it does not need a regretful hankering after the past, or a fettering of the free intelligence by the words uttered long ago by ignorant men. It needs a fearless outlook and a free intelligence. It needs hope for the future, not looking back all the time towards a past that is dead, which we trust will be far surpassed by the future that our intelligence can create."

History
The first German edition was published in 1932 by Kreis der Freunde monistischen Schrifttums, a monist association in Dresden inspired by Ernst Haeckel. In 1957, Paul Edwards preferred Russell over the then more trendy Ludwig Wittgenstein and published the essay and further texts referring to the background of The Bertrand Russell Case. Russell had been denied a professorship in New York for his political and secular views, tolerance for gay and lesbian behaviour, and support of eugenics, particularly directed toward sterilizing "feeble-minded women". Some countries banned the book, including South Africa. The enhanced version has been republished in various editions since the 1960s. The New York Public Library listed it among the most influential books of the 20th century.

Similarly titled works by other authors
 Como e porque sou romancista (How and Why I am a Novelist), an autobiography by Brazilian writer José Alencar, published in 1893.
 Why I Am an Atheist, an essay by Indian revolutionary Bhagat Singh, published in 1930.
 Why I Am Not a Conservative, an essay by Austrian School economist Friedrich Hayek, published in 1960.
 Why I Am Still a Christian, a book by Catholic theologian Hans Küng, published in 1987.
 Why I Am Not a Muslim, a 1995 book by Ibn Warraq, is also critical of the religion in which the author was brought up — in this case, Islam. The author mentions Why I Am Not a Christian towards the end of the first chapter, stating that many of its arguments also apply to Islam.
 Why I Am Not a Hindu, a 1996 book in a similar vein by Kancha Ilaiah, an activist opposed to the Indian caste system.
 Why I Am Not a Secularist (2000) by William E. Connolly.
 Why I Am Not a Scientist (2009) , by biological anthropologist Jonathan M. Marks.
 Why I Am Not A Christian, by philosopher and independent scholar Richard Carrier.
 Why I Am Not a Communist, by Karel Čapek, a 1924 essay in Přítomnost magazine.
 Why I Am Not A Property Dualist, an essay by John Searle in which he criticises the philosophical position of property dualism.
 How I Stopped Being a Jew, a 2014 book by Israeli historian Shlomo Sand.
 Why I Am a Christian, a 2003 book by English author John Stott.
 Why I Am a Hindu, a 2018 book by Indian author Shashi Tharoor.
"Why I Am Not an Austrian Economist", an essay by economist Bryan Caplan
 Why Am I a Heathen, an essay by Wong Chin Foo Why I Am Not a Buddhist, book by Evan Thompson, publ. 2020, Yale Univ. Press, criticizes what he calls Buddhist exceptionalism, the idea in contemporary culture that (among other things) falsely views Buddhism as a kind of science, a mind science. Author mentions Russell's essay on p.22. Chapter 2 takes specific aim at Why Buddhism is True'' by Robert Wright. Instead of science or Buddhism, Thompson advocates the cosmopolitanism approach of Kwame Anthony Appiah, among others.

References

External links 
 Text of essay at the Bertrand Russell Society website
 Annotated text

1927 essays
Essays by Bertrand Russell
Books critical of Christianity
Books critical of religion
Books about atheism
Censored books
Censorship in South Africa
Irreligion
Skepticism
Freethought
Philosophy of religion literature
Pamphlets